The Queen's Royal Lancers (QRL) was a cavalry regiment of the British Army. It was formed in 1993 and amalgamated with the 9th/12th Royal Lancers (Prince of Wales's) on 2 May 2015 to form the Royal Lancers.

History

The regiment was formed in 1993 by the amalgamation of the 16th/5th Queen's Royal Lancers with the 17th/21st Lancers.

From its formation, the regiment served in the armoured role with first Challenger 1, then Challenger 2. However, in 2005, as part of the re-organisation of the army, the regiment started converting to the formation reconnaissance role, re-equipping with the Scimitar armoured reconnaissance vehicle.

As part of the Army 2020 reforms intended to reduce the size of the British Army in line with the Strategic Defence and Security Review, it was announced that the 9th/12th Royal Lancers would amalgamate with the Queen's Royal Lancers to form a single regiment, the Royal Lancers, on 2 May 2015.

Organisation
The regiment was organised into four squadrons, each of which perpetuates one of the antecedent regiments: 
 the 16th Lancer Squadron, 
 the 17th Lancer Squadron, 
 the 21st Lancer Squadron 
 and the 5th Lancer Squadron.

Regimental museum
The Royal Lancers and Nottinghamshire Yeomanry Museum is based at Thoresby Hall in Nottinghamshire.

Traditions
The regiment's nickname, the 'Death or Glory Boys', came from their cap badge and was known as "the motto". This was the combined cap badges of the two antecedent regiments, and features a pair of crossed lances, from the 16th/5th Queen's Royal Lancers, together with a skull and crossbones, below which is a ribbon containing the words 'Or Glory'. This comes from the 17th/21st Lancers, and was the cap badge of the 17th Lancers (the original 'Death or Glory Boys').

Battle honours
The battle honours are:
16th/5th battle honours

Combined honours before amalgamation of 16th and 5th Lancers:

Blenheim, Ramillies, Oudenarde, Malplaquet, Beaumont, Willems, Talavera, Fuentes d'Onor, Salamanca, Vittoria, Nive, Peninsula, Waterloo, Bhurtpore, Ghuznee 1839, Afghanistan 1839, Maharajpore, Aliwal, Sobraon,  Suakin 1885, Relief of Kimberley, Paardeberg, Siege of Ladysmith, South Africa 1899-1902
First World War: Mons, Le Cateau, Retreat from Mons, Marne 1914, Aisne 1914, Messines 1914, Ypres 1914 '15, Bellewaarde, Arras 1917, Cambrai 1917, Somme 1918, St. Quentin, Pursuit to Mons

After amalgamation of 16th and 5th Lancers:

Second World War: Kasserine, Fondouk, Kairouan, Bordj, Djebel Kournine, Tunis, Gromballa, Bou Ficha, North Africa 1942-43, Cassino II, Liri Valley, Monte Piccolo, Capture of Perugia, Arezzo, Advance to Florence, Argenta Gap, Traghetto, Italy 1944-45
Wadi al Batin, Gulf 1991

17th/21st battle honours

Combined honours before amalgamation of 17th and 21st Lancers:

Alma, Balaklava, Inkerman, Sevastopol, Central India, South Africa 1879, Khartoum, South Africa 1900-02
First World War:  Festubert, Somme 1916 '18, Morval, Cambrai 1917 '18, St. Quentin, Avre, Hazebrouck, Amiens, Pursuit to Mons, France and Flanders 1914-18, N.W. Frontier India 1915 '16

After amalgamation of 17th and 21st Lancers:

Second World War: Tebourba Gap, Bou Arada, Kasserine, Thala, Fondouk, El Kourzia, Tunis, Hammam Lif, North Africa 1942-43, Cassino II, Monte Piccolo, Capture of Perugia, Advance to Florence, Argenta Gap, Fossa Cembalina, Italy 1944-45

Queen's Royal Lancers

After amalgamation of 16th/5th Lancers and the 17th/21st Lancers into the Queens' Royal Lancers:

Al Basrah, Iraq 2003

Alliances
 - Lord Strathcona's Horse (Royal Canadians)
 - 12th/16th Hunter River Lancers
 - HMS Ark Royal

Affiliated Yeomanry
Sherwood Rangers

Colonel-in-Chief
1993–2015: HM Queen Elizabeth II

Regimental Colonels
Colonels of the regiment were:

1993–1995: Maj-Gen. Alastair Wesley Dennis, CB, OBE (ex 16/5 Lancers)
1995–2001: Lt-Gen. Sir Richard Swinburn, KCB
2001–2006: Brig. William James Hurrell, CBE
2006-2011: Maj-Gen. Andrew Cumming 
2011-2015: Maj-Gen. Patrick Marriott, CB CBE

Commanding Officers 
Regimental Commanding Officers included:

 1993–1994: Lieutenant Colonel Robert A. McKenzie Johnston
 1994–1996: Lt Col Alick I. Finlayson
 1996–1998: Lt Col Rudi N. Wertheim
 1998–2000: Lt Col Patrick Claude Marriott
 2000–2002: Lt Col James Rupert Everard
 2002–2004: Lt Col Charles S. Fattorini
 2004–2006: Lt Col Andrew G. Hughes
 2006–2008: Lt Col Richard B. Nixon-Eckersall
 2008–2011: Lt Col Martin Todd
 2011–2013: Lt Col Nigel J. Best
 2013–2015: Lt Col Julian N. E. Buczacki

References

External links

Official site
British Army Locations from 1945

Cavalry regiments of the British Army
Military units and formations established in 1993
Royal Armoured Corps